Day Stars is a 1966 Soviet drama film directed by Igor Talankin.

Plot 
The film tells about the Soviet poetess who achieved the greatest success during the siege of Leningrad.

Cast 
 Alla Demidova as Olga Bergoltts
 Andrei Popov as Olga's father
 Konstantin Baranov
 Tatyana Lennikova
 Aleksandra Malysheva
 Yelena Borisova
 Ivan Ufimtsev
 Anatoly Ignatyev

References

External links 
 

1966 films
1960s Russian-language films
Soviet drama films
1966 drama films